Tan See Leng (born 1964) is a Singaporean politician and former medical practitioner who has been serving as Minister for Manpower since 2021 and Second Minister for Trade and Industry since 2020. A member of the governing People's Action Party (PAP), he has been the Member of Parliament (MP) representing the Marine Parade division of Marine Parade GRC since 2020.

Before entering politics, Tan was a medical practitioner by profession. He founded Healthway Medical Group and had served in top positions in Parkway Holdings, Parkway Pantai and IHH Healthcare. 

He made his political debut in the 2020 general election as part of a five-member PAP team and won about 57% of the vote in Marine Parade GRC.

Early life
Tan was born in Singapore in 1964. As the only child, he grew up with his father, Tan Seow Chiap, an SBS bus timekeeper, and a homemaker mother who took up as many odd jobs as possible to alleviate the family's financial constraints. He had been fostered out to a Cantonese-speaking nanny to be cared for, staying at Sam Leong Road, next to Desker Road with her on weekdays. Only on weekends did he stay with his parents at a rented flat in Toa Payoh. This arrangement continued until he was five or six years old.

Education 
Tan attended Monk's Hill Primary School, Monk's Hill Secondary School and National Junior College before graduating from the Yong Loo Lin School of Medicine at the National University of Singapore in 1988 with a Bachelor of Medicine, Bachelor of Surgery (MBBS).

While in National Junior College, he joined the choir as part of his Co-Curricular Activity (CCA).

Tan funded his university education all by himself, with an annual school fee of S$3,000, by tutoring junior college students in subjects like mathematics, biology, physics and chemistry. With up to eight students at a time, he earned about S$800 to S$1,000 per month.

He subsequently went on to complete a Master of Medicine degree in family medicine at the National University of Singapore in 1998. In 2003, he was awarded the Fellow of College of Family Physicians by the College of Family Physicians Singapore. 

In 2004, he obtained a Master of Business Administration degree from the University of Chicago Booth School of Business. 

In 2014, he became a Fellow of the Academy of Medicine Singapore.

Career
In 1992, at the age of 27, Tan founded Healthway Medical Group with a group of friends, through a bank loan of S$90,000 and an initial capital investment of S$5,000 from each of the initial stakeholders. As co-founder and chairman of the company, he grew the group to become the second largest private primary care group in Singapore. In 2004, he successfully divested the group to British United Provident Association Healthcare.

In 2004, Tan joined Parkway Holdings as the chief operating officer of Mount Elizabeth Hospital and was eventually promoted to as the executive director of Pantai Holdings, chief executive officer of Pantai Hospitals Division and the head of Malaysia operating division of Parkway until 2008.

From 2010 to 2019, Tan was the group chief executive officer and managing director of Parkway Holdings and Parkway Pantai Limited. From 2014 to 2019, he was also the chief executive officer and managing director of IHH Healthcare BHD. During his tenures, some of his contributions included delisting Parkway Holdings in 2010 and relisting IHH Healthcare in 2012 into one of the largest initial public offerings in the world in 2012, expanding and growing the group from 15 hospitals in 2009 to 84 hospitals as of the end of 2019, leading the mergers and acquisitions of Acibadem Healthcare (Turkey), Fortis Healthcare (India), and multiple hospitals across Asia. Under his leadership, IHH Healthcare Berhad has won multiple awards, including the Best Managed and Best Overall Corporate Governance Poll awards by Asiamoney in 2016.

In 2019, he retired from the position of group chief executive officer and managing director of Parkway Holdings and Parkway Pantai Limited.

Over the years, Tan has held numerous ministerial advisory and medical committee appointments. For instance, since 2009, he has been a member of the board of trustees of the College of Family Physicians Singapore (CFPS). He also served in various capacities with CFPS Holdings Pte Ltd, including as its chairman from 2008 to 2010 and vice president from 2011 to 2013. In November 2013, he was appointed by the Ministry of Health as a member of the MediShield Life review committee.

Moreover, he has maintained active involvement in academia through board memberships and appointments. From 2011 to 2019, he was adjunct assistant professor of Duke-NUS Graduate Medical School Singapore, Office of Education. He has also sat on the Advisory Board of Lee Kong Chian School of Business at Singapore Management University.

Apart from the medical field, he has also contributed to the business scene. In 2012, Tan was appointed a council member of the Singapore-Guangdong Collaboration Council. The council aims to deepen Singapore's engagement with China's Guangdong province and benefit Singapore businesses through joint exploration of new opportunities in the region.

Political career
Tan made his political debut in the 2020 general election as part of a five-member PAP team contesting in Marine Parade GRC and won. Since 10 July 2020, he has been serving as the Member of Parliament (MP) representing the Marine Parade ward of Marine Parade GRC. He was subsequently appointed Second Minister for Trade and Industry and Minister for Manpower on 27 July 2020 and 15 May 2021 respectively.

On 3rd Oct 2022, Tan See Leng, responding in Parliament to questions by 6 MPs on how the foreign workforce was complementing the local talent pipeline and how locals were getting fair consideration for jobs, replied that it is not a zero-sum game and that bringing in global talents create jobs for locals.

Volunteer experience
A passionate supporter of improving healthcare provision through innovations and private-public collaboration, Tan has guest-lectured at many international symposiums, including the Harvard Business School's series on healthcare entrepreneurship. He has also previously provided advisory inputs as an expert panel member for the Department of Health, National Health Service in the United Kingdom.

Since Tan retired in 2019, he has been active in the community. He acts as patron of WeCare Community Enabling Network in Marine Parade and attends weekly Meet-the-People sessions at the Marine Parade constituency. He also actively reaches out to the Marine Parade community to connect with and understand them better. For example, Tan has set up and is helming a Caregivers Support Network in Marine Parade. This network aims to serve as “a conduit” that can facilitate help for caregivers of the sick and elderly, against the backdrop of an older demographic in Marine Parade.

Accolades 
2004: Tan was awarded the Long Service Award from the People’s Association Singapore.

2007: Tan was awarded the prestigious College of Family Physicians Singapore Albert and Mary Lim Award, the highest accolade awarded for contribution and services rendered to the college and to the discipline of Family Medicine. This was in appreciation of his contribution to CFPS, where he successfully organised the 18th Wonca World Conference in Singapore, which netted CFPS a net profit of more than US$1.3 million.

2015: Named Asia Innovator of the Year at the 14th CNBC Asia Business Leaders Awards (ABLA) 2015

2016: Asiamoney Best Executive in Malaysia, Asiamoney best CEO in Investor Relations

2017: Won the ABLA Corporate Social Responsibility Award

2019: Singapore Medical Association Merit Award 2019

Notes and references 

1964 births
Living people
National University of Singapore alumni
People from Singapore
People's Action Party politicians
Singaporean people of Chinese descent
Singaporean people of Teochew descent
Members of the Parliament of Singapore
Members of the Cabinet of Singapore
Ministers for Manpower of Singapore